Acrocera bimaculata is a species of small-headed flies in the family Acroceridae.

Distribution
Canada, United States.

References

Acroceridae
Insects described in 1866
Diptera of North America
Taxa named by Hermann Loew